Dmitri Sergeyevich Samoylov (born 20 April 1990) is a former Russian professional football player.

Club career
He played in the Russian Football National League for FC Luch-Energiya Vladivostok in 2009.

External links
 
 

1990 births
Living people
Russian footballers
Association football forwards
FC Luch Vladivostok players
FC Smena Komsomolsk-na-Amure players